Zacatzontli, in Aztec mythology, is the god of day road, he has an eagle as sun's symbol guide. He holds in his left hand a staff and his right hand supports an backpack full of quetzals. He can be a protector of merchants, thus equating him with the Mayan god Ek Chuáj. One of the odd things about Zacatzontli is that he doesn't have a headdress, only a feather. His name could mean Lord of the Road or His Road The Lord, although the former seems more likely.

See also
List of Aztec gods
Aztec religion

Sources 

Aztec gods
Mythological birds of prey
Birds in mythology